Antarctothoa is a genus of bryozoans belonging to the family Hippothoidae.

The species of this genus are found in southern parts of Southern Hemisphere.

Species:

Antarctothoa annae 
Antarctothoa antarctica 
Antarctothoa aporosa 
Antarctothoa ballia 
Antarctothoa bathamae 
Antarctothoa bougainvillei 
Antarctothoa buskiana 
Antarctothoa cancer 
Antarctothoa cancinoi 
Antarctothoa delta 
Antarctothoa dictyota 
Antarctothoa discreta 
Antarctothoa galaica 
Antarctothoa haywardi 
Antarctothoa mauricei 
Antarctothoa muricata 
Antarctothoa pansa 
Antarctothoa pellucida 
Antarctothoa polystachya 
Antarctothoa tongima

References

Bryozoan genera